"Scam" is a song by the British band Jamiroquai. The song appeared on the band's second album, The Return of the Space Cowboy. Live performances of the song during The Return of the Space Cowboy tour usually began with a lengthy trumpet solo, and have placed the song at the end of a long chain of songs segued into one another (most often in the order "Blow Your Mind", "Light Years", "Who the Funk Do You Think You Are?", "Emergency on Planet Earth", "Scam"). During the following tours, the song was mostly standalone. A "smooth remix" of the song was planned for a cancelled remix album called Interpretations from Beyond, which was scheduled to be released after Travelling Without Moving.

Composition and production
The song was created by merging two live-only Jamiroquai songs from the Emergency on Planet Earth era, "Do That Dance" and "Life Goes on" into one. Many elements were taken from both of the songs, such as the horn/trumpet line from the chorus of "Life Goes On", and some chord progressions from "Do That Dance". The album version of the song took heavy damage in terms of sound fidelity, as it was reduced to an "early radio"-like quality.

Theme
The song centres on fraud, the ones who commit it and the ones who are its victims. The song's protagonist tells a story of how he has to "Scam - that's the way to stay alive", because he himself was a victim of a one, as heard in a verse ("See, I had to lose my car, job, wife, dog, and home,/debts and threats on the telephone"). However, it also tells how politicians also lie to their people, giving false promises, and abusing their own powers.

1994 songs
Jamiroquai songs
Protest songs
Songs written by Toby Smith
Songs written by Jason Kay
Songs written by Stuart Zender